Lay Low is an Icelandic artist and singer.

Lay Low may also refer to:

"Lay Low", 1984 song by Trauma from their album Scratch and Scream
"Lay Low" (Snoop Dogg song), 2001 
"Lay Low" (Mark Morriss song), 2008
"Lay Low" (Blake Shelton song), 2013
"Lay Low" (Josh Turner song), 2014
Lay Low", song by DJ Tiësto, 2023

See also
Laylow (disambiguation)
 Laid Low (song), a song by The Naked and Famous
 Laid Low (EP), a 2016 EP by Everything in Slow Motion